There have been seven baronetcies created for persons with the surname Herbert, three in the Baronetage of England, one in the Baronetage of Ireland and three in the Baronetage of the United Kingdom. All creations are extinct.

Herbert baronets, of Red Castle (1622)
The Herbert Baronetcy, of Red Castle in the County of Montgomery, was created in the Baronetage of England on 16 November 1622. For more information on this creation, see Marquess of Powis.

Herbert baronets, of Derrogh (1630)
The Herbert Baronetcy, of Derrogh in the King's County, was created in the Baronetage of Ireland on 4 December 1630 for George Herbert. The title became extinct on the death of the third Baronet in 1712.
Sir George Herbert, 1st Baronet (died )
Sir Edward Herbert, 2nd Baronet (c. 1620–1677)
Sir George Herbert, 3rd Baronet (c. 1673–1712)

Herbert baronets, of Tintern (1660)
The Herbert Baronetcy, of Tintern in the County of Monmouth, was created in the Baronetage of England on 3 July 1660 for the traveller and historian Thomas Herbert. The title became extinct on the death of the sixth Baronet in 1740.
Sir Thomas Herbert, 1st Baronet (1606–1682)
Sir Henry Herbert, 2nd Baronet (1639–1687)
Sir Humphrey Herbert, 3rd Baronet (c. 1674–1701)
Sir Thomas Herbert, 4th Baronet (c. 1700–1724)
Sir Henry Herbert, 5th Baronet (c. 1675–1733)
Sir Charles Herbert, 6th Baronet (1680–1740)

Herbert baronets, of Bromfield (1660)
The Herbert Baronetcy, of Bromfield in the County of Shropshire, was created in the Baronetage of England on 18 December 1660 for Matthew Herbert. The title became extinct on his death in 1668. His brother Richard Herbert was the grandfather of Henry Herbert, 1st Earl of Powis (see Earl of Powis).
Sir Matthew Herbert, 1st Baronet (died 1668)

Herbert baronets, of Llanarth (1907)
The Herbert Baronetcy, of Llanarth in the County of Monmouth, was created in the Baronetage of the United Kingdom on 19 July 1907. For more information on this creation, see Ivor Herbert, 1st Baron Treowen.

Herbert baronets, of Boyton (1936)
The Herbert Baronetcy, of Boyton in the County of Wiltshire, was created in the Baronetage of the United Kingdom on 18 July 1936 for Sidney Herbert, Member of Parliament for Scarborough and Whitby and Westminster Abbey. He was the son of the Hon. Sir Michael Herbert, fourth son of Sidney Herbert, 1st Baron Herbert of Lea (see Baron Herbert of Lea), younger son of George Herbert, 11th Earl of Pembroke (see Earl of Pembroke). The title became extinct on his death in 1939.
Sir Sidney Herbert, 1st Baronet (1890–1939)

Herbert baronets, of Wilton (1937)
The Herbert Baronetcy, of Wilton in the County of Wiltshire, was created in the Baronetage of the United Kingdom on 1 March 1937 for the Hon. George Sidney Herbert, Gentleman Usher to George V and Edward VII. He was a younger son of Sidney Herbert, 14th Earl of Pembroke and the younger brother of Reginald Herbert, 15th Earl of Pembroke (see Earl of Pembroke). The title became extinct on his death in 1942.
Sir George Sidney Herbert, 1st Baronet (1886–1942)

References

Extinct baronetcies in the Baronetage of England
Extinct baronetcies in the Baronetage of Ireland
Extinct baronetcies in the Baronetage of the United Kingdom